Alan Rickman was an English actor of the stage and screen. Rickman gained international acclaim for his role as Severus Snape in the Harry Potter film series (2001–2011) and Hans Gruber in the action film Die Hard (1988). He is also known for his performances in films such as the romance drama Truly, Madly, Deeply (1991), Robin Hood: Prince of Thieves (1991), Ang Lee's adaptation of the Jane Austen novel Sense and Sensibility (1995), Neil Jordan's historical drama Michael Collins (1995), Richard Curtis' romantic comedy Love Actually (2003), and the science fiction comedies Galaxy Quest (1999) and Hitchhiker's Guide to the Galaxy (2005).

Film

Television

Video games

Theatre

See also
List of awards and nominations received by Alan Rickman

References

External links
 
 

Male actor filmographies